John K. O'Brien (born John K. Byrne, June 12, 1860 – November 20, 1910) was an American Major League Baseball player. He played primarily catcher and first base from 1882 to 1890 in the American Association.

External links

Baseball Almanac

1860 births
1910 deaths
19th-century baseball players
Major League Baseball catchers
Major League Baseball first basemen
Philadelphia Athletics (AA) players
Brooklyn Grays players
Baltimore Orioles (AA) players
San Francisco Reno players
Philadelphia Athletics (minor league) players
St. Paul Apostles players
Duluth Whalebacks players
Baseball players from Philadelphia

 Jack O'Brien at SABR (Baseball BioProject)